A trailer is an unpowered vehicle towed by a powered vehicle. It is commonly used for the transport of goods and materials.

Sometimes recreational vehicles, travel trailers, or mobile homes with limited living facilities where people can camp or stay have been referred to as trailers. In earlier days, many such vehicles were towable trailers.

United States 

In the United States, the term is sometimes used interchangeably with travel trailer and mobile home, varieties of trailers and manufactured housing designed for human habitation. Their origins lay in utility trailers built in a similar fashion to horse-drawn wagons. A trailer park is an area where mobile homes are placed for habitation.

The latter, when towed as part of a tractor-trailer or "18-wheeler", carries a large percentage of the freight that travels over land in North America.

Types

Some trailers are made for personal (or small business) use with practically any powered vehicle having an appropriate hitch, but some trailers are part of large trucks called semi-trailer trucks for transportation of cargo.

Enclosed toy trailers and motorcycle trailers can be towed by commonly accessible pickup truck or van, which generally require no special permit beyond a regular driver's license. Specialized trailers like open-air motorcycle trailers, bicycle trailers are much smaller, accessible to small automobiles, as are some simple trailers, have a drawbar and ride on a single axle. Other trailers, such as utility trailers and travel trailers or campers come in single and multiple axle varieties, to allow for varying sizes of tow vehicles.

There also exist highly specialized trailers, such as genset trailers, pusher trailers and other types that are also used to power the towing vehicle. Others are custom-built to hold entire kitchens and other specialized equipment used by carnival vendors. There are also trailers for hauling boats.

Trackless train

Utility 
A utility trailer is an all purpose trailer to carry almost anything. It can be open or completely closed.

Fixed Plant 
A Fixed Plant Trailer is a special purpose trailer built to carry units which usually are immobile such as large generators & pumps

Bicycle 

A bicycle trailer is a motor less wheeled frame with a hitch system for transporting cargo by bicycle.

Construction 

 Toilets are usually provided separately.
Construction trailers are mobile structures (trailers) used to accommodate temporary offices, dining facilities and storage of building materials during construction projects. The trailers are equipped with radios for communication.

Travel

Popular campers use lightweight trailers, aerodynamic trailers that can be towed by a small car, such as the BMW Air Camper. They are built to be lower than the tow vehicle, minimizing drag.

Others range from two-axle campers that can be pulled by most mid-sized pickups to trailers that are as long as the host country's law allows for drivers without special permits. Larger campers tend to be fully integrated recreational vehicles, which often are used to tow single-axle dolly trailers to allow the users to bring small cars on their travels.

Teardrop

Semi

A semi-trailer is a trailer without a front axle. A large proportion of its weight is supported either by a road tractor or by a detachable front axle assembly known as a dolly. A semi-trailer is normally equipped with legs, called "landing gear", which can be lowered to support it when it is uncoupled.

Semi-trailers vary considerably in design, ranging from open-topped grain haulers through Tautliners to normal-looking but refrigerated  x  enclosures ("reefers"). Many semi-trailers are part of semi-trailer trucks. Other types of semi-trailers include dry vans, flatbeds and chassis.

Many commercial organizations choose to rent or lease semi-trailer equipment rather than own their own semi-trailers, to free up capital and to keep trailer debt from appearing on their balance sheet.

Full

A full trailer is a term used in the United States and New Zealand for a freight trailer supported by front and rear axles and pulled by a drawbar. In Europe this is known as an A-frame drawbar trailer, and in Australia it is known as a dog trailer. Commercial freight trailers are produced to length and width specifications defined by the country of operation.

As per AIS 053, full trailer is a towed vehicle having at least two axles, and equipped with a towing device which can move vertically in relation to the trailer and controls the direction of the front axle(s), but which transmits no significant static load to the towing vehicle. Common types of full trailers are flat deck, hardside/box, curtainside or bathtub tipper style with axle configurations up to two at the drawbar end and three at the rear of the trailer.

This style of trailer is also popular for use with farm tractors.

Close-coupled

A close-coupled trailer is fitted with a rigid towbar which projects from its front and hooks onto a hook on the tractor. It does not pivot as a drawbar does.

Motorcycle

A motorcycle trailer may be a trailer designed to haul motorcycles behind an automobile or truck. Such trailers may be open or enclosed, ranging in size from trailers capable of carrying several motorcycles or only one. They may be designed specifically to carry motorcycles, with ramps and tie-downs, or may be a utility trailer adapted permanently or occasionally to haul one or more motorcycles.

Another type of motorcycle trailer is a wheeled frame with a hitch system designed for transporting cargo by motorcycle. Motorcycle trailers are often narrow and styled to match the appearance of the motorcycle they are intended to be towed behind. There are two-wheeled versions and single-wheeled versions. Single-wheeled trailers, such as the Unigo or Pav 40/41, are designed to allow the bike to have all the normal flexibility of a motorcycle, usually using a universal joint to enable the trailer to lean and turn with the motorcycle. No motorcycle manufacturer recommends that its motorcycles be used to tow a trailer because it results in additional safety hazards for motorcyclists.

Livestock

There are a number of different styles of trailers used to haul livestock such as cattle, horses, sheep and pigs. The most common is the stock trailer, a trailer that is enclosed on the bottom, but has openings at approximately the eye level of the animals to allow ventilation. The horse trailer is a more elaborate form of stock trailer. Because horses are usually hauled for the purpose of competition or work, where they must be in peak physical condition, horse trailers are designed for the comfort and safety of the animals. They usually have adjustable vents and windows as well as suspension designed to provide a smooth ride and less stress on the animals. In addition, horse trailers have internal partitions that assist the animal in staying upright during travel and protect horses from injuring each other in transit. Larger horse trailers may incorporate additional storage areas for horse tack and may even include elaborate living quarters with sleeping areas, bathroom and cooking facilities, and other comforts.

Both stock trailers and horse trailers range in size from small units capable of holding one to three animals, able to be pulled by a pickup truck, SUV or even a quad bike; to large semi-trailers that can haul a significant number of animals.

Boat

Roll trailer

Baggage trailer 

Baggage trailers are used for the transportation of loose baggage, oversized bags, mail bags, loose cargo carton boxes, etc. between the aircraft and the terminal or sorting facility. Dollies for loose baggage are fitted with a brake system which blocks the wheels from moving when the connecting rod is not attached to a tug. Most dollies for loose baggage are completely enclosed except for the sides which use plastic curtains to protect items from weather. In the US, these dollies are called baggage carts, but in Europe baggage cart means passenger baggage trolleys.

Hydraulic modular trailer 
A hydraulic modular trailer (HMT) is a special platform trailer unit which feature swing axles, hydraulic suspension, independently steerable axles, two or more axle rows, compatible to join two or more units longitudinally and laterally and uses power pack unit (PPU) to steer and adjust height. These trailer units are used to transport oversized load, which are difficult to disassemble and are overweight. These trailers are manufactured using high tensile steel, which makes it  possible to bear the weight of the load with the help of one or more ballast tractors which push and pull these units via drawbar or gooseneck together making a heavy hauler unit.

Typical loads include oil rig modules, bridge sections, buildings, ship sections, and industrial machinery such as generators and turbines. There is a limited number of manufacturers who produce these heavy-duty trailers because the market share of oversized loads is very thin when we talk about transportation industry. There are self powered units of hydraulic modular trailer which are called SPMT which are used when the ballast tractors can not be applied.

Bus trailer 

A bus trailer is for transporting passengers hauled by a tractor unit similar like that of a truck. These trailers have become obsolete due to the issue of the communication between the driver and the conductor and traffic jams.

Hitching

A trailer hitch, fifth-wheel coupling or other type of tow hitch is needed to draw a trailer with a car, truck or other traction engine.

Ball and socket
A trailer coupler is used to secure the trailer to the towing vehicle. The trailer coupler attaches to the trailer ball. This forms a ball and socket connection to allow for relative movement between the towing vehicle and trailer while towing over uneven road surfaces. The trailer ball is mounted to the rear bumper or to a draw bar, which may be removable. The draw bar is secured to the trailer hitch by inserting it into the hitch receiver and pinning it. The three most common types of couplers are straight couplers, A-frame couplers, and adjustable couplers. Bumper-pull hitches and draw bars can exert tremendous leverage on the tow vehicle making it harder to recover from a swerving situation.

Fifth wheel and gooseneck

Both the hitches are better than a receiver hitch and allow a more efficient and central attachment of a large trailer to the tow vehicle. They can haul large loads without disrupting the stability of the vehicle. Traditional hitches are connected to the rear of the vehicle at the frame or bumper, while fifth wheel and gooseneck trailers are attached to the truck bed above the rear axle. This coupling location allows the truck to make sharper turns and haul heavier trailers. They can be mounted in the bed of a pickup truck or any type of flatbed. A fifth-wheel coupling is also referred to as a kingpin hitch and is a smaller version of the semi-trailer "fifth wheel". Though a fifth wheel and a gooseneck trailer look much the same, their method for coupling is different. A fifth wheel uses a large horseshoe-shaped coupling device mounted  or more above the bed of the tow vehicle. A gooseneck couples to a standard  ball mounted on the bed of the tow vehicle. The operational difference between the two is the range of movement in the hitch. The gooseneck is very maneuverable and can tilt in all directions, while the fifth wheel is intended for level roads and limited tilt side to side. Gooseneck mounts are often used for agricultural and industrial trailers. Fifth-wheel mounts are often used for recreational trailers. Standard bumper-hitch trailers typically allow a 10% or 15% hitch load while a fifth wheel and gooseneck can handle 20% or 25% weight transfer.

Jacks
The basic function of a trailer jack is to lift the trailer to a height that allows the trailer to be hitched or unhitched to and from the towing vehicle. Trailer jacks are also used for leveling the trailer during storage. The most common types of trailer jacks are A-frame jacks, swivel jacks, and drop-leg jacks. Some trailers, such as horse trailers, have a built-in jack at the tongue for this purpose.

Electrical components 
Many older cars took the feeds for the trailer's lights directly from the towing vehicle's rear light circuits. As bulb-check systems were introduced in the 1990s "by-pass relays" were introduced. These took a small signal from the rear lights to switch a relay which in turn powered the trailer's lights with its own power feed. Many towing electrical installations, including vehicle-specific kits incorporate some form of bypass relays.

In the US, trailer lights usually have a shared light for brake and turn indicators. If such a trailer is to be connected to a car with separate lamps for turn indicator and brake a trailer light converter is needed.

Nowadays some vehicles are being fitted with CANbus networks, and some of these use the CANbus to connect the tow bar electrics to various safety systems and controls. For vehicles that use the CANbus to activate towing-related safety systems, a wiring kit that can interact appropriately must be used. Without such a towbar wiring kit the vehicle cannot detect the presence of a trailer and can therefore not activate safety features such as trailer stability program which can electronically control a snaking trailer or caravan.

By-pass systems are cheap, but may not be appropriate on cars with interactive safety features.

Brakes 

Larger trailers are usually fitted with brakes. These can be either electrically operated, air operated, or overrun brakes.

Stability 
Trailer stability can be defined as the tendency of a trailer to dissipate side-to-side motion. The initial motion may be caused by aerodynamic forces, such as from a cross wind or a passing vehicle. One common criterion for stability is the center of mass location with respect to the wheels, which can usually be detected by tongue weight. If the center of mass of the trailer is behind its wheels, therefore having a negative tongue weight, the trailer will likely be unstable. Another parameter which is less commonly a factor is the trailer moment of inertia. Even if the center of mass is forward of the wheels, a trailer with a long load, and thus large moment of inertia, may be unstable.

Some vehicles are equipped with a Trailer Stability Program that may be able to compensate for improper loading.

See also 

 Electric vehicle battery
 ISO 3833
 Towing
 Towing capacity
 Tractor unit
 Trailer Brake Controller
 Vehicle category
 Walking floor

List of types of trailers

 Bicycle trailer
 Boat trailer
 Bus trailer
 Compressed hydrogen tube trailer
 Construction trailer
 Dolly
 Dump trailer
 Enclosed cargo trailer
 Flat deck trailer
 Frac Tank
 Genset trailer
 Horse trailer
 Hydraulic modular trailer
 Jeep trailer
 Liquid hydrogen trailer
 Lowboy (trailer)
 Mafi roll trailer
 Mobile home
 Motorcycle trailer
 Popup camper
 Pusher trailer
 Roll trailer
 Semi-trailer
 Solar trailer (for solar vehicles)
 Tautliner
 Tank trailer
 Travel trailer

References

External links 

 
 

 
Freight transport

kk:Тіркеме